Itaru (written: , ,  or  in hiragana) is a masculine Japanese given name. Notable people with the name include:

, Japanese baseball player
, pseudonym of a female Japanese manga artist
, Japanese Magic: The Gathering player
, Japanese publisher
Itaru Nakamura (born 1963), Japanese police bureaucrat
, Japanese rugby union player

Fictional characters
, a character in the video game A3!

Japanese masculine given names